This is a list of fashion weeks, events and fashion shows held annually or two times a year in the United States. The list is ordered alphabetically.

List 
 Africa Fashion Week New York
 Africa Fashion Week Houston
 Baltimore Fashion Week
 Dallas Fashion Week
 Detroit Fashion Week
 DC Fashion Week
 Denver Fashion Week
 Fashion in Film Festival
 Fashion Rocks
 Fashion Week Cleveland
 Ford Models Supermodel of the World
 Glamorama
 Hair Wars
 Houston Fashion Week
 Los Angeles Fashion Week
 Men's Fashion Week
 Men's Fashion Week Los Angeles
 Mercedes-Benz Fashion Week Miami
 Met Ball
 Miami Fashion Week

 New York Fashion Week (capital)
 PLITZS New York City Fashion Week
 Fall 2008 fashion weeks
 List of Fall 2008 New York Fashion Week fashion shows
 Men's Fashion Week
 Spring 2008 New York Fashion Week
 Saint Louis Fashion Week
 Omaha Fashion Week
 Oklahoma City Fashion Week
 Kansas City Fashion Week
 Pittsburgh Fashion Week
 Rip the Runway
 Victoria's Secret Fashion Show

See also 
 List of fashion events

References

United States
 
Fashion